Below the Surface is a Danish action hostage thriller drama television series, written and directed by Kasper Barfoed, that was based upon an idea of Adam Price and Søren Sveistrup. The first eight-part series focuses on an act of terrorism committed on the Copenhagen Metro, where fifteen people are taken hostage. Former soldier Philip Nørgaard (Johannes Lassen), who is head of the PET Terror Task Force, tries to save the hostages with help from members of his elite team.

The basis for the series was adapted from a series of conversations between Barfoed and Danish photographer Daniel Rye, who lived as a hostage within the terrorist organisation of Islamic State in Syria for more than a year. In Germany, the series is also known as Countdown Kopenhagen.

On 2 April 2017, the series premiered in Denmark on Kanal 5, and was released on DVD in Germany on 19 October 2017. In the United Kingdom, BBC4 broadcast the first four episodes during March 2018. The BBC pulled the series from their schedule for 24 March only following the terrorist attack in Carcassonne and continued on 31 March. The second season premiered on 26 March 2019 in Denmark.

Cast

PET Terror Task Force
 Johannes Lassen as Philip Nørgaard
 Sara Hjort Ditlevsen as Louise Falck
 Alexandre Willaume as SP
 Flemming Enevold as Hans Hejndorf
 Esben Dalgaard Andersen as Esben Garnov
 Peder Thomas Pedersen	as Simon Clausen
 Kenneth M. Christensen as Daniel Cramer
 Kasper Leisner as Ebbe Moller

Civilians
 Paprika Steen as Naja Toft
 Jesper Hyldegaard as Aksel Bendix
 Henning Jensen as Henning Nørgaard
 Cecilie Stenspil as Anne Gornstein
 Henrik Prip as Palle Wulff

Hostages
 Alba August as Marie Bendix
 Sus Wilkins as Denise Hansen 
 Dar Salim as Adel Rasul
 Lane Lind as Bodil Pedersen
 Michael Asmussen as Joachim
 Anders Nyborg	as Ricco 
 Allan Hyde as Silas Jensen
 Tommy Kenter as Leon

Criminals
 Jakob Oftebro as Alpha
 Adnan Hasković as Bravo 
 Muhamed Hadžović as Charlie
 Jacob Lohmann as Jonas
 Hadi Ka-Koush as Ahmed Mahmoud

Plot summary
In Series 1, 15 people are held hostage in a subway train. A police terror taskforce led by former-Jaeger Corps soldier Philip Norgaard (Johannes Lassen) and Louise Falk (Sara Hjort Ditlevsen) is dispatched to rescue them. Meanwhile, reporter Naja Toft (Paprika Steen) acts as a go-between with the hostages and police. As the media frenzy takes hold, the country becomes divided on whether to negotiate with the terrorists or not.

Episodes

Filming

The team responsible for filming the series attended the 67th Berlin International Film Festival, where the series was promoted prior to the broadcast of the first episode.

See also
List of Danish television series

References

External links

2017 Danish television series debuts
2017 Danish television series endings
2010s Danish television series
Danish drama television series
2018 British television series debuts
2018 British television series endings
Danish crime television series
Danish-language television shows
Television series by StudioCanal
Kanal 5 (Danish TV channel) original programming